Chak-i Wardak or simply Chak is a city along the Logar River (locally called "Chak River") in Maidan Wardak Province, central Afghanistan. It is the administrative center of Chaki Wardak District. The Chaki Wardak Dam is located nearby.

The town of Chaki Wardak has a population of 5,065. It is located within the heartland of the Wardak tribe of Pashtuns.

History

Archaeological excavations carried out in Chaki Wardak indicate that the history of human settlement in this region goes back to ancient times. Outside Chaki Wardak, there are many ancient Buddhist remains, including a fortified monastery and six stupas, one of which contained a bronze vase with a Kharoshthi inscription that held 61 Kushan coins, which is now in the British Museum's collection.

Geography
Chaki Wardak is located about 2,172 m above sea level.

Demographics
A majority of the population are Pashtuns. The residents mostly belong to the Wardak tribe.

References

Populated places in Maidan Wardak Province